Our Graceful Words is the first full-length studio album by Christian rock band Sent by Ravens. It is the follow-up to their 2008 EP, The Effects of Fashion and Prayer. The album was released on April 20, 2010 and reached No. 35 on the Billboard Top Heatseekers chart.

Track listing

Charts

References

2010 debut albums
Sent by Ravens albums